John Davis (1933-2023) is an American industrialist and perennial candidate from Newstead, New York. Davis ran four times for New York's 26th congressional district seat in the U.S. House of Representatives between 2004 and 2011, three times as a Democrat (twice as the general election candidate against incumbent Tom Reynolds and a third time in a three-way primary) and once as an independent.

Davis's political campaigns are primarily motivated by his concern that the country is being destroyed by U.S. free trade policies, which he says have led to the outsourcing of jobs to foreign countries and the decline of manufacturing in the United States. Noted for his party-switching, Davis has said that had he won the 2011 election, he would have caucused in the House with the Republican and Tea Party caucuses.

A lifelong Republican, Davis switched to the Democrats after being kicked out of a fundraiser headlined by Dick Cheney in 2003 when he tried to ask Cheney questions about free trade policies. He then ran for the U.S. Congress seat in his home district, NY-26, in 2004, 2006 and 2008 as a self-funded candidate, pouring in millions of his own funds and coming close to beating the incumbent Republican Thomas Reynolds in 2006. In the 2008 election, however, he came in third out of three in the Democratic primary. He switched his affiliation back to Republican with the election of fellow wealthy industrialist Chris Lee, becoming an ally and supporter of Lee. After Lee's abrupt departure from Congress in February 2011, Davis tried and failed to get the Republican nomination to replace Lee and decided to run as an independent on a newly created Tea Party line.

Davis is the owner of I Squared R Element Company, a silicon carbide heating elements company that he founded in 1964. He is also known for filing a successful lawsuit against the Federal Election Commission in 2006, claiming that the so-called "millionaire's amendment" to McCain-Feingold Act was unconstitutional. The U.S. Supreme Court, with Justice Alito writing for the 5–4 majority, sided with Davis, striking down the millionaire's amendment as violating the First Amendment to the United States Constitution for fundamentally restricting the right of a self-financing candidate to spend his or her own money in a preferred way.

Early years and education and business career
Davis grew up in Western, New York and attended Amherst Central High School. In 1955, Davis graduated from the University of Buffalo with a bachelor's degree in engineering. Davis would later fund the construction of UB's Davis Hall, which was named after him. Following graduation, Davis served in the Marine Corps and in the U.S. Coast Guard as a lieutenant.

He began work as an engineer in 1958, first at General Motors as a maintenance engineer, then at The Carborundum Company as a supervising sales engineer.

In 1964, Davis started his silicon carbide heating element manufacturing business, I Squared R Element, out of his garage and now employs 75 people in Akron, New York. He has touted the fact that he has never outsourced any jobs. According to 2011 financial disclosure statements, Davis' net worth is between $18.2 million and $83.4 million (about half that of his opponent Jane Corwin).

Party affiliations
Davis was a self-described "Goldwater Republican" for 50 years. In late 2003, he attended a Republican fundraiser in Buffalo, featuring Vice President Dick Cheney. Davis insisted on talking to Cheney about U.S. free trade policies, which Cheney's staff refused to allow, ordering Davis to be ejected from the fundraiser. Davis then quit the Republican party. He later became a Democrat (2003), then founded the Save Jobs Party (2004–05), then rejoined the Republican Party (2008), and in March 2011 created the Tea Party ballot line by obtaining the required number of signatures.

Political career

In 2004 and 2006 Davis ran as a Democrat in the general elections facing no primary challengers. He lost both times to incumbent Republican Tom Reynolds, described by the New York Times as one of the most powerful Republicans in Congress. In the 2008 race, Davis finished third place in a three-way Democratic primary to Alice Kryzan. In the ongoing 2011 election, Davis, who has been a registered Republican since 2008, is now s running on the "Tea Party" line.  He has said he is running again because of his concern that the country is being destroyed.

A major theme of Davis' campaigns is that too many U.S. manufacturing jobs have been outsourced to foreign countries, with 53,000 manufacturing plants closed in the past 30 years and 17 million Americans presently unemployed. He believes U.S. free trade policies and agreements have caused the job loss and the great recession. He says the free trade policies have been pushed by multinational corporations and big box stores such as Walmart who effectively have purchased the White House and the U.S. Congress. Davis says he is free of those influences, and wants to go to Washington to save American jobs, farms and industries.

2004 Congressional campaign

In 2004, Davis officially entered politics, running as a Democrat for the U.S. Congress from the 26th District of New York against incumbent Republican Representative Tom Reynolds, who was considered unbeatable. Davis doubled his original financial commitment to the race, pouring a total of $1.2 million of personal money into his campaign. Reynolds was forced to begin running campaign ads for the first time since his election in 1998.

On election day, Reynolds won, 56 percent to 44 percent; in contrast, he won the 2002 election 75 percent to 25 percent against the Democratic challenger. Many cite the amount spent by Davis as compared to Reynolds' prior challenger as the primary factor for the change. Some observers attributed the narrowed margin of victory to an undercurrent of resentment in the working-class areas of the 26th district over economic decline and a lack of manufacturing sector jobs. Others attributed the margin to the politics of the specific candidates; Reynolds' politics more closely resembling big-government neo-conservatism while Davis' more closely resembles the limited-government libertarian conservatism of Goldwater, the type of conservative thought more widely adhered to in Upstate New York.

After the election, Davis was fined for a violation of campaign finance reporting laws. Davis had used his non-profit "Save Jobs" organization to funnel money into his political efforts, failing to comply with political disclosure requirements of both the federal government and New York State.

Save Jobs Party
Following his defeat in 2004, Davis continued his political activism by forming the Save Jobs Party to further his goals of repealing free-trade agreements, such as the North American Free Trade Agreement (NAFTA) and the Central American Free Trade Agreement (CAFTA). Davis believed that free-trade allowed low-wage nations, such as China to compete unfairly with American-produced manufactured goods and agricultural crops. Davis believed that this would be a popular idea in his native Upstate New York, which contained many struggling farms and factories. Although Republicans accused him of using the party merely as a springboard for a 2006 rematch against Reynolds, Davis sponsored more than a dozen candidates for public office in races across Western New York.

However, the Save Jobs party soon ran into trouble with state and federal officials. In one incident, an Erie County legislator sought an FBI investigation over
last-minute automated phone calls (robocalls] that had been made from Davis's campaign headquarters. In early 2006, Davis' state PAC was sued in State Supreme Court for improper filing of financial disclosures. Davis abandoned the fledgling party.

2006 Congressional campaign

Davis ran against Reynolds as the candidate of the Democratic, Working Families and Independence Parties in 2006. Davis received the Democratic nomination since no other Democrat chose to run in the September 12, 2006 primary. He appeared on three ballot lines and votes from all three nominating parties counted towards Davis' total under New York's electoral fusion rule. As in 2004, Reynolds won, but by a much narrower margin.

With the Mark Foley scandal in full swing, pundits re-evaluated the odds of Davis winning against Reynolds. It was widely reported that Reynolds had knowledge of earlier e-mails between Foley and a page, although he was unaware of more explicit instant messages reported by ABC News.

Davis led Reynolds in several polls taken during October 2006, but an early November poll showed him trailing 46 to 50. He lost by a "hair's breadth", according to The Washington Post.

2008 Congressional campaign

After Reynolds announced his retirement from Congress in 2008, Davis ran a third time for the seat. He began as the odds-on favorite to win the Democratic Party nomination but he faced stiff competition from Iraq War veteran and teacher Jon Powers. Democrats viewed Powers as their strongest candidate, and blamed Davis' attack ads for taking him out in the primary. Powers finished second, Davis third, with little-known environmental attorney Alice Kryzan winning the primary. She lost the general election to Republican Christopher J. Lee 55–40 percent.

Davis v. Federal Election Commission

Davis filed a successful lawsuit against the Federal Election Commission between his 2006 and 2008 runs for office, claiming that the so-called "millionaires amendment" to the McCain-Feingold Act election reform law was unconstitutional. The U.S. Supreme Court, with Justice Alito writing for the 5–4 majority, struck down parts of the act as violating the First Amendment for fundamentally restricting the right of a self-financing candidate to spend his or her own money in a preferred way.

2011 Congressional campaign

Davis changed his political affiliation from Democratic back to Republican in 2010, after developing a favorable working relationship with Chris Lee over the course of Lee's time in office. He expressed interest in the special election to replace Lee, who resigned in February 2011. Davis met with the Republican chairs regarding a possible run, but according to Davis, the meeting "didn't go great". The Party was dissatisfied with his brief time in the Democratic Party and his willingness to run on a third-party line if he didn't get the Republican nomination, according to the Lockport Union-Sun & Journal. A GOP county chair told The Buffalo News that Davis had disqualified himself by expressing views that were contrary to typical Republican positions. The Republican nomination went to Jane Corwin. Davis also had discussions with Erie County Conservative Party chairman Ralph Lorigo regarding a potential run on that line, but after Corwin received Republican nomination, the other two parties put her on their ballot lines.

Finally, Davis briefly, but unsuccessfully courted the Democrats for their nomination, then decided to run on a newly created independent line, under the name "Tea," sending out paid campaign workers to collect the 3,500 required signatures for a ballot listing (Davis's campaign workers collected over 12,000 signatures in total). He received the endorsement of the Tea Party Coalition of New York, but his Republican opponent Corwin got the endorsements of TEA New York and the Tea Party Express. Davis has said that if elected, he will caucus with the Republicans and Tea Party caucus because his opinions and positions align more closely with those groups than with the Democrats. The Tea Party Coalition is an organization run by Libertarian Party activists James Ostrowski and Allen Coniglio, who use the name "Tea Party" for the ballot line on which they run their independent candidates; Ostrowski and Coniglio previously had used the line for David DiPietro in a state senate race and Janice Volk in a congressional special election in another district prior to Davis using the line.

Political positions
Davis' ideology is "too inconsistent to be readily categorized", according to The Washington Post. When asked about the issue of illegal immigration during his interview for the Republican endorsement in 2011, Davis reportedly shocked local Republican leaders by suggesting that illegal immigrants could be deported and unemployed black youth bussed from the cities to pick the crops. Davis' spokesperson said the comments could be viewed as politically and racially incorrect; "but when you have African American people in Buffalo who do not have jobs and are out of work, why are you bringing people into this country illegally to take jobs?" he asked.

Davis' main issue is his opposition to free-trade policies and agreements which he believes have allowed low-wage nations, such as the People's Republic of China, to compete unfairly with American-produced manufactured goods and agricultural crops.

Davis been described as favoring gun rights, and has said that his position on the Second Amendment rights is similar to that of other members of the Tea Party movement. He has given inconsistent answers on the issue of abortion rights. Davis opposes the Patient Protection and Affordable Care Act and also opposed the Emergency Economic Stabilization Act of 2008.

Campaign
The special election was initially thought to be a "certain victory" for the Republican candidate, but became "fiercely competitive", according to The New York Times, because of a U.S. House Republican plan to privatize Medicare. The Times also cited the third party candidacy of Davis as a factor which is "siphoning support" from Corwin.

A late April poll by Sienna College had Corwin in the lead with 36 percent, followed by Hochul with 31 percent and Davis with 23 percent of the vote. An early May poll by the Democratic-leaning Public Policy Institute showed Hochul at 35 percent, Corwin at 31 percent and Davis at 24 percent. An unusual number of voters had a negative opinion of each candidate, according to the pollster: Hochul, 42 percent for Corwin and 43 percent for Davis.

National media attention was given to a 15-second video clip that appeared to show Corwin's Assembly chief of staff, Michael Mallia, repeatedly asking Davis why he had skipped a campaign debate, followed by Mallia yelping as Davis apparently shoved him or flapped at the camera. The video clip was circulated by local and national Republican organizations and prompted bipartisan criticism of both Davis and Mallia. Requests to see a longer tape and a tape made by second camera were refused by Corwin and her campaign. In response to Davis' complaints that he had been harassed, Corwin said, "I've had cameras on me for two months now, and I've never hit anybody ... and I think that's the difference is how you handle a situation like that."

The Tea Party Express and TEA New York which endorsed Corwin traveled to Rochester and Buffalo to hold events where they criticized Davis' use of the Tea Party name. After the election, TEA New York blamed Davis for Hochul's win.

Roll Call reported that Davis had promised to spend as much as $3 million of his own funds and that Corwin had invested nearly $2.5 million of her own funds in the campaign as of May 13. Roll Call also said that outside funds coming from both liberal and conservative groups had "turned the Buffalo and Rochester airwaves into a steady stream of campaign ads." Davis, in contrast to his opponents, received no assistance from outside funds.

Electoral history

See also
 List of political parties in New York
 Radical center

References

External links
 Buffalo Business Journal editorial discussing Davis' activism.
 Davis' official campaign website
 I Squared R Element Company official business site
 

1933 births
American manufacturing businesspeople
American political candidates
Living people
People from Erie County, New York
University at Buffalo alumni
Tea Party movement activists
New York (state) Republicans
New York (state) Democrats
Businesspeople from Pittsburgh
Businesspeople from New York (state)
People from Amherst, New York
Activists from New York (state)
Amherst Central High School Alumni